Tim Davey (born 16 September 1987) is an Australian cricketer. He played two first-class and five List A matches for South Australia between 2012 and 2014.

See also
 List of South Australian representative cricketers

References

External links
 

1987 births
Living people
Australian cricketers
South Australia cricketers
Place of birth missing (living people)